Zincirli Madrasa (Медресе Ланцюгів) is a madrasa, built of stone by Meñli I Giray in 1500 near Bakhchisarai,  Crimea.

History
Zincirli Madrasa was established in 1500 by Khan Meñli I Giray. It was a traditional Islamic school of higher learning and served generations of students until 1917, when it was turned into a medical school by the Bolshevik authorities. In 1939, the complex of buildings surrounding the Zincirli Madrasa became a mental hospital. After the return to their homeland, Crimean Tatars were able to gain control of the historic madrasa building.

The lost grave of Ismail Bey Gaspirali also lies within the madrasa compound and is represented by a symbolic grave marker. The madrasa takes its name from the large chain (zincir) that hangs over the entrance door.

References

External links

Crimean Khanate
Crimean Tatar culture
Islam in Crimea
Madrasas
15th-century madrasas
Cultural heritage monuments of federal significance in Crimea